Robert Alexander Sheppard (24 August 1879 – 28 January 1953) was an English first-class cricketer active 1904–06 who played for Surrey. He was born in Beddington and died in Carshalton.

References

1879 births
1953 deaths
English cricketers
Surrey cricketers
Gentlemen cricketers
W. G. Grace's XI cricketers